Iolaus helenae is a butterfly in the family Lycaenidae. It is found in north-eastern Zambia.

The larvae feed on Agelanthus zizyphifolius vittatus, Agelanthus subulatus and Englerina inaequilatera.

References

Butterflies described in 1989
Iolaus (butterfly)
Endemic fauna of Zambia
Butterflies of Africa